Mujumbar (also Romanized as Mūjūmbār; also known as Moo Jambar, Mūjombār, Mūjonbār, Mushembar, and Mu yi Shimr) is an Armenian village in Rudqat Rural District, Sufian District, Shabestar County, East Azerbaijan Province, Iran. At the 2006 census, its population was 391, in 92 families.

References 

Populated places in Shabestar County